Red Firecracker, Green Firecracker is a 1994 film directed by He Ping and starring Ning Jing, Wu Gang, Zhao Xiaorui, Gao Yang, Xu Zhengyun and Zhao Liang.

Plot 
A young woman inherits her father's fireworks factory, as he had no son. The business does well and everything works in an orderly fashion until one day an itinerant painter is hired to decorate the doors and vases at the factory for Chinese New Year. The woman, forbidden to marry as it would involve outsiders in the factory ownership, is drawn to the headstrong painter. When they fall in love, the situation throws her entire life into disarray.

External links

1994 films
Chinese romantic drama films
1990s Mandarin-language films
Films based on Chinese novels
Films set in the 1910s
Films directed by He Ping
1994 drama films